Straminergon is a genus of mosses belonging to the family Amblystegiaceae.

The genus has almost cosmopolitan distribution.

Species:
 Straminergon stramineum Hedenäs, 1993

References

Amblystegiaceae
Moss genera